Ferrari has made a number of V12 racing engines designed for Formula One; made between 1950 and 1995. Some derived engines were also used in various Ferrari sports prototype race cars and production road cars.

1.5 L engine (1950-1951)
After finding only modest success with the supercharged 1.5-litre engine, Ferrari decided to switch in 1950 to a naturally-aspirated engine formula for the series.

3.3 L/4.1 L/4.5 L engine (1950-1951)
Calling in Aurelio Lampredi to replace Gioacchino Colombo as technical director, Enzo Ferrari directed that the company work in stages to grow and develop an entirely new large-displacement V12 engine for racing.

The 3.3-litre (3322 cc/202 in) 275 Lampredi engine made its debut at the Grand Prix of Belgium on June 18. With three Weber 42DCF carburetors, a single overhead camshaft for each bank of cylinders, and two valves per cylinder, the engine produced a capable 300 hp (224 kW) at 7200 rpm. Alberto Ascari drove the car to fifth place, marking the end of the 3.3-litre engine. The 275 was replaced at the Grand Prix of Nations at Geneva on July 30, 1950, by the 340 F1 engine. As the name suggests, the car sported a larger 4.1-litre (4101.66 cc/250 in) version of Lampredi's V12. With 335 hp (250 kW), Ascari was able to keep up with the Alfa Romeo 158 of Juan Manuel Fangio but retired with engine trouble. Although the 340 proved itself capable, it was only the middle step in Ferrari's 1950 car development. Ferrari achieved the 4.5-litre goal of the formula with the 375 Lampredi engine, two of which debuted at Monza on September 3, 1950. This 4.5-litre (4493.73 cc/274 in) engine produced roughly the same power as its 4.1-litre predecessor, but its tractability earned Ascari second place in that debut race. A series of modifications through the 1951 season allowed Ferrari to finally put Alfa Romeo behind it in a Formula One race, with José Froilán González' victory at Silverstone on July 14 becoming the constructor's first World Championship win. Ascari's wins at the Nürburgring and Monza and strong finishes throughout the season cemented the company's position as a Formula One contender.

2.6 L engine (1951)
The 1951 Ferrari 212 F1 was powered by a naturally aspirated, 2562 cc Colombo V12 engine. Rudi Fischer also entered the car in Formula Two races using a Ferrari 166 1995cc V12 engine. He won the Formula Two races at Aix-les-Bains and Angoulême in 1951.

3.0 L engine (1966-1980)
For the 1966 Formula One season, there was a change in the technical regulations, now allowing 3-litre engines. Ferrari's first 1966 car consisted of a 3.3-litre V12 engine that was taken from the Ferrari 275P2 sportscar prototypes, modified to 3 litres, and mounted in the back of an F1 chassis. The designation 312, which would be used for a number of later cars, indicated a 3-litre, 12-cylinder engine. The engine was rather heavy, and due to the reduced capacity, lower on power and especially torque. John Surtees drove this contraption unsuccessfully in Monaco while Lorenzo Bandini drove a Ferrari Dino 2.4-litre V6. Surtees won the second race, the 1966 Belgian Grand Prix, a track that favoured power with its long straights, but the 1964 champion departed after a row with manager Eugenio Dragoni. The issue was about priorities in racing, as Ferrari was under pressure from Ford in sports car racing, and the F1 effort was somewhat neglected. Mike Parkes replaced Surtees, who went to Cooper which used Maserati engines, to finish second in the driver championship with a further win. For Ferrari, Ludovico Scarfiotti also won a race, the 1966 Italian Grand Prix at Monza which helped Ferrari finish second in the Constructors' Championship.

3.5 L engine (1989-1994)
The 3.5-litre Tipo 035/5 V12 engine, introduced in 1989, was designed in accordance with the new regulations imposed by the FIA, after the ban on turbocharged engines. The engine was unreliable, but it won on its debut race.

The Ferrari 641 was powered by the 3.5-litre Tipo 036 V12 engine, and later in San Marino by the updated  Tipo 037.

During the early part of the  season, the Tipo 041 engine, used in the Ferrari 412 T1, initially produced 750 bhp @ 15,300 rpm. This quickly and heavily evolved, when a new engine, named Tipo 043 debuted at the 1994 San Marino Grand Prix qualifying sessions, and was first raced in Hockenheim.  It was designed from scratch by Claudio Lombardi and former Honda F1 chief engine designer Osamu Goto with a wider vee-angle of 75 degrees (up from 65 degrees) and a shorter stroke, replacing the old Tipo 041; Ferrari had brought on a number of engineers from the successful Honda F1 engine program. The 043 became famous for its great amount of power (over 830 bhp) and for its characteristic noise.

By the end of the 1994 season, Ferrari's Tipo 043 V12 was putting out around  @ 15,800 rpm, which is to date the most-powerful naturally-aspirated V12 engine ever used in Formula One.

3.0 L engine (1995)
The engine's design was largely influenced by major regulation changes imposed by the FIA after the dreadful events during the year before: the V12 engine was reduced from 3.5 to 3.0 litres. The 3.0-litre engine produced around 700 hp (522 kW) 17,000 rpm in race trim; but was reportedly capable of producing up to 760 hp in its highest state of tune for qualifying. They eventually switched to a more conventional V10 engine for 1996, which offered the best compromise between power and fuel efficiency; the V12 was powerful but thirsty, and vice versa for a V8.

Other applications
Southgate later described it as "one of the most reliable race engines I have ever worked with."

The 4.7 L naturally aspirated Tipo F130B 60-valve V12 engine used in the Ferrari F50 was developed from the 3.5 L V12 used in the 1990 Ferrari 641 Formula One car.

Applications

Formula 1 cars
Ferrari 125 F1 (125 Colombo)
Ferrari 212 F1 (212 Colombo)
275 F1 / 340 F1 / 375 F1 (Tipo 275 / Tipo 340 / Tipo 375)
Ferrari 312 F1 (Tipo 228, Tipo 218, Tipo 242, Tipo 242C)
Ferrari 640 / F1-89 (Tipo 035/5)
Ferrari 641 / F1-90 (Tipo 036) 
Ferrari 642 / F1-91 (Tipo 037 / Tipo 291)
Ferrari 643 (Tipo 291)
Ferrari F92A (Tipo 038 / E1 A-92) 
Ferrari F93A (Tipo 041 / E2 A-93)
Ferrari 412 T1 (Tipo 043 / E4 A-94) 
Ferrari 412 T2 (Tipo 044/1)

Sports cars/Sports Prototype race cars
Ferrari 312 P
Ferrari F333 SP
Ferrari F50 GT

Road cars
Ferrari F50

See also
List of Ferrari engines

References 

Ferrari engines
Formula One engines
Gasoline engines by model
V12 engines
Engines by model